Curtis Pendleton Smith (October 21, 1863 – February 20, 1919), attorney and civic leader, was mayor of Dallas, Texas, in 1917–19.

Biography
Curtis Pendleton Smith was born October 21, 1863, in Vincennes, Indiana, to Dr. Hubbard Madison Smith and Nannie Willis Pendleton.  He married Anna Elizabeth Renick, daughter of William H and Martha Renick on October 9, 1891, in Bourbon County, Kentucky.  They had one son: William Renick Smith

C. P. Smith came to Dallas in 1887 where he practice law. His civic involvement included service on the school board, as assistant city attorney, as a member of the board of aldermen, and as judge of the city court.  He resigned the judgeship to run for mayor in 1906.  During his term as office modern street paving began.

He wrote Texas notarial manual and form book: A handy manual for notaries public, conveyancers, banks, business men and attorneys in the state of Texas and other books. He was a Mason, Odd Fellow and a member of Delta Tau Delta.

He died February 20, 1919, in Dallas, Texas and was interred at the Paris Cemetery, Paris, Kentucky.

References

1863 births
1919 deaths
Mayors of Dallas
19th-century American politicians